Potamonautes berardi is a species of freshwater crab in the family Potamonautidae. It is found in the Nile Basin in Egypt, Ethiopia, Sudan, Tanzania and Uganda. Its natural habitats are rivers and streams.

References

Potamoidea
Freshwater crustaceans of Africa
Crustaceans described in 1826
Taxonomy articles created by Polbot